The second season of Love Games: Bad Girls Need Love Too premiered on April 18, 2011, with Bad Girls Club alumni Tanisha Thomas as the host.

Format
Alumni from previous seasons of The Bad Girls Club are "looking for the man of their dreams." For season two, the house chosen for the show is the Canfield-Moreno Estate. Three "bad girls" have a choice of 15 bachelors to explore love, friendships, etc. Each week features a variety of challenges. The "bad girls" battle it out and compete to be the "HBIC" - Tanisha Thomas says that it stands for not Head Bitch In Charge, but instead Head Badgirl in Charge. Instead of season 1 with each "bad girl" choosing who is up for elimination, the "HBIC" chooses who is up for elimination.

Cast

"Bad Girls"

Contestants

Elimination chart

: In Episode 5, John quit after realizing he had stronger feelings for his current girlfriend Johanna and not the other girls.
: In Episode 7, Amber was also eliminated.
: In Episode 8, the guys got to choose which girl to eliminate. Tanisha informed the guys that chose the eliminated girl would be automatically eliminated. In the end, Lea had enough votes to stay thus winning Love Games and Natalie was eliminated along with Corey B. and Taylor.
: In Episode 8, after the second Bad Girl went home, Lea eliminated Nick.
: In Episode 8, Lea eliminated Benz before the Final Elimination because Benz told Lea to pick Robert while on their date together.

Episodes

References

External links
 

2011 American television seasons